Ruthless refers to a lack of conscience or empathy.

Ruthless may also refer to:

Music 
 Ruthless!, a 1992 musical
 Ruthless (Ace Hood album), 2009
 Ruthless (Bizzy Bone album), 2008
 Ruthless (Gary Allan album), 2021
 Ruthless Records, a hip hop record label
 Ruthless Records (Chicago), a punk record label

Other uses 
 Ruthless (film), a 1948 film starring Zachary Scott
 Ruthless (horse), a racehorse
 Ruthless (novel), a Pretty Little Liars novel by Sara Shepard
 Ruthless: Scientology, My Son David Miscavige, and Me, a 2016 book by Ron Miscavige and Dan Koon
 Ruthless (TV series), TV series premiered 2020, by Tyler Perry

See also
 Ruthless Stakes, a horse race run at Aqueduct Racetrack
 Tom Clancy's ruthless.com, a computer game